Avondale is a city in Maricopa County, Arizona, United States, adjacent to Phoenix. As of the 2020 census, the population of the city was 89,334, up from 76,238 in 2010 and 35,883 in 2000.

Avondale, incorporated in 1946, has experienced rapid residential and commercial growth in the years since 1980. Once primarily a sparsely populated farming community with many acres of alfalfa and cotton fields, Avondale has transformed into a major bedroom suburb for Phoenix.

Phoenix Children's Hospital has a satellite facility (the Southwest Valley Urgent Care Center), at the corner of Avondale Boulevard and McDowell Road.

Geography
Avondale is located at  (33.435322, −112.349758). It is bordered to the west by Goodyear, to the north by Litchfield Park, and to the east by Phoenix and Tolleson. 

The Gila River crosses the southern part of the city, joined from the north by the Agua Fria River.

Interstate 10 crosses the northern part of Avondale, with access from exits 129 through 133A. The freeway leads east  to Downtown Phoenix and west  to Blythe, California.

Demographics
Avondale first appeared on the 1920 U.S. Census as the 45th Precinct of Maricopa County (AKA Coldwater). In 1930, it simply appeared as the Coldwater Precinct. It was recorded as having a Spanish/Hispanic majority for that census (the census would not separately feature that racial demographic again until 1980). With the combination of all county precincts into three districts in 1940, it did not report on that census. In 1946, it was incorporated as the town of Avondale, and has appeared on every census since 1950. In 1959, it upgraded to a city.

As of the census of 2000, there were 35,883 people, 10,640 households, and 8,724 families residing in the city. The racial makeup of the city was 63.27% White, 5.20% Black or African American, 1.28% Native American, 1.89% Asian, 0.14% Pacific Islander, 24.32% from other races, and 3.89% from two or more races. 46.23% of the population were Hispanic or Latino of any race.

There were 10,640 households, out of which 47.9% had children under the age of 18 living with them, 62.9% were married couples living together, 12.7% had a female householder with no husband present, and 18.0% were non-families. 12.9% of all households were made up of individuals, and 3.1% had someone living alone who was 65 years of age. The average household size was 3.36 and the average family size was 3.66.

In the city, the population was spread out, with 34.2% under the age of 18, 9.7% from 18 to 24, 33.1% from 25 to 44, 17.7% from 45 to 64, and 5.3% who were 65 years of age or older. The median age was 29 years. For every 100 females, there were 102.4 males. For every 100 females age 18 and over, there were 101.1 males.

The median income for a household in the city was $49,153, and the median income for a family was $51,084. Males had a median income of $35,134 versus $27,487 for females. The per capita income for the city was $16,919. About 10.3% of families and 13.8% of the population were below the poverty line, including 17.2% of those under age 18 and 16.7% of those age 65 or over.

In 2010 Avondale had a population of 78,256. The racial and ethnic composition of the population was 50.3% Hispanic or Latino, 34.0% non-Hispanic white, 9.3% black or African American, 1.7% Native American, 3.5% Asian, 0.4% Pacific Islander, 0.2% non-Hispanic of some other race and 4.5% reporting two or more races.

History 

William "Billy" G. Moore, arrived in Arizona in the late 1860s, settling near the Agua Fria River in 1880. Moore called bought land and named his settlement "Coldwater, Arizona" - apparently for both the river, and the water that flowed from a local spring. He served a brief stint as Justice of the Peace for the Agua Fria area. He eventually established a stage stop near Agua Fria crossing, the Coldwater Stage Station in the 1880’s. The state station was one of the very earliest stage stations in the region, supplying travelers with provisions on their way from Tucson to northern Arizona and California. A saloon and a general store was also built, bringing in more commerce for the settlement.  

The post office was established in 1896 at a site near Avondale Ranch. From 1901 until 1905, William Moore served as Postmaster of the Coldwater post office. The post office eventually became known as Avondale, taking the name of the nearby ranch, and the name Coldwater was discontinued. In December 1946, the City of Avondale was incorporated.

Subsequent development resulted in a conglomeration of styles and architecture along Western Avenue typical of small western towns, with ranching, the railroad,and cotton farming as main industries. Recently, the city has seen tremendous growth in new development, both residential and commercial, while the Old Town area along Western Avenue preserves the historic business district and safeguards opportunities for small, independent businesses. 

Avondale is a modern city, near the heart of the Phoenix-metropolitan area. Over the last decade, population growth took place at a rate of over 114%, making the city one of the fastest-growing in Maricopa County.

Governmental representation
Avondale falls within Arizona's 3rd Congressional District, served by Representative Raúl Grijalva and Arizona's 19th State Legislative District, served by Representatives Lorenzo Sierra and Diego Espinoza and Senator Lupe Contreras, all Democrats.

Climate
Avondale has a large amount of sunshine year round due to its stable descending air and high pressure. According to the Köppen Climate Classification system, the city has a Hot desert climate, abbreviated "Bwh" on climate maps.

The record low temperature recorded in Avondale is 16 °F (−9 °C). Summers are extremely hot, with daily high temperatures at or above 100 °F (38 °C) for the entirety of June, July, and August, as well as many days in May and September. An occasional heat wave will spike temperatures over 115 °F (46 °C) briefly. Avondale's record high temperature stands at an impressive 125 °F (52 °C), a few degrees warmer than the record for Phoenix, and just  shy of Arizona's state record of 128 °F (53 °C), recorded in Lake Havasu City on June 29, 1994.

Snow is rare in the area, occurring once every several years. Lows in the winter occasionally dip below freezing, which may damage some desert plants such as saguaros and other cacti. In the summer (mainly July, August and early September), the North American Monsoon can hit the Phoenix area in the afternoon and evening (possibly continuing overnight), causing rain showers even from a sunny morning. Dust storms are occasional, mainly during the summer.

Notable people

 Mitch Garcia, professional soccer player, graduated from Agua Fria High School
 Shawn Gilbert, professional baseball player; played high school baseball at Agua Fria High School
 Everson Griffen, defensive end for USC Trojans and Minnesota Vikings; attended Agua Fria High School
 Nick Harris, punter for NFL's Detroit Lions; attended Westview High School
 Drisan James, wide receiver for CFL's Hamilton Tiger-Cats; attended Westview High School
 Craig Mabbitt, vocalist for band Escape the Fate and former vocalist for bands Blessthefall and The Word Alive; attended Westview High School
 Randall McDaniel, former NFL offensive guard, inducted into National Football Foundation College Hall of Fame in 2008 and Pro Football Hall of Fame in 2009; he was a sprinter at Agua Fria High School
 Clancy Pendergast, defensive coordinator of the Kansas City Chiefs
 Shelley Smith, professional football player

Education
Avondale is served by the Littleton Elementary School District, the Avondale Elementary School District, the Agua Fria Union High School District and Tolleson Union High School District.Within city boundaries are four public high schools—Agua Fria High School, La Joya Community High School, Westview High School and West Point High School. 

Avondale also has several charter schools. Legacy Traditional School and Imagine Schools  for elementary and middle school education, and Estrella High School and St. John Paul II Catholic High School for high school.

Estrella Mountain Community College, established in 1992, is located in the city. Rio Salado College, a part of the Maricopa County Community College District, has a satellite building in Avondale. Universal Technical Institute and Empire Beauty Schools also have campuses in Avondale.

Healthcare
The public hospital system, Valleywise Health (formerly Maricopa Integrated Health System), operates Valleywise Community Health Center – Avondale. Its sole hospital, Valleywise Health Medical Center, is in Phoenix.

Sports

Avondale is home to Phoenix Raceway. It holds two NASCAR Cup Series races, two Xfinity Series races, a NASCAR Gander RV and Outdoors Truck Series race, an ARCA Menards Series race, and an ARCA Menards Series West race annually.

The City of Avondale Parks and Recreation Department offers sports for both youth and adults.

Transportation
Avondale is served by Valley Metro Bus. The Avondale ZOOM neighborhood circulator provides local service within Avondale. Avondale is also served by local routes 3 (Van Buren Street, 17 (McDowell Road), 41 (Indian School Road, express route 563 to Downtown Phoenix, and rural route 685 connecting Ajo and Phoenix.

City parks
Alamar Park, 4155 S El Mirage Rd
Las Ligas, 12421 W Lower Buckeye Road
Festival Fields, 101 E. Lower Buckeye
Donnie Hale Park, 10857 West Pima St.
Friendship Park / Dog Park, 12325 West McDowell
Mountain View, 201 E Mountain View Drive
Sernas Plaza Park, 521 E Western Ave
Fred Campbell Park, 101 E Lawrence Blvd
Dennis DeConcini, 351 E Western Ave
Dessie Lorenz Park, 202 E Main St
Doc Rhodes Park, 104 W Western Ave

Gila and Salt River Meridian

The surveying marker of the Gila and Salt River Meridian is located on Monument Hill. Ever since 1851, this has been the center point used by the state to measure the land in Arizona. The federal government recognized this point for measuring the boundary between the United States and Mexico after the Mexican–American War ended. The first survey, conducted in 1867, involved the first  of Arizona. Up until 1874, this was the epicenter of all surveying in Arizona for property deeds. It was listed in the National Register of Historic Places on October 15, 2002, Reference #02001137. Monument Hill is located at 115th Avenue and Baseline Road in Avondale.

See also

Goodyear Farms Historic Cemetery

References

External links

 
Cities in Arizona
Cities in Maricopa County, Arizona
Phoenix metropolitan area
Populated places in the Sonoran Desert